Calamagrostis hillebrandii is a species of grass in the family Poaceae known commonly as Hillebrand's reedgrass. It is endemic to Maui in Hawaii, where there are only two known subpopulations with a total of perhaps 500 individuals. This is a federally listed endangered species of the United States.

References

hillebrandii
Endemic flora of Hawaii
Endangered plants
Taxonomy articles created by Polbot